Supply management can refer to:
Supply management (procurement), the methods and processes of modern corporate or institutional buying
Supply Management (magazine)
Dairy and poultry supply management in Canada